Cobalt & the Hired Guns is an Americana-punk pop-rock band based in Chicago. They have been interviewed in The Deli Magazine, where they were named Chicago's Artist(s) of the Month. In May 2009, they were finalists for MetroMix's Rock 'n' Vote competition, but first place went to another local band, I Fight Dragons. Other online reviews include The Brooklyn Paper's video review, and Jersey Beat.

History
Matt Hart and Tomlinson Fort are the founding members of CATHG, and members Mike Roth and Jesse Alexander joined soon after the band's inception in 2003 at Oberlin College in Ohio. The band members graduated from Oberlin in 2006, and headed back to Chicago, where Matt and Tomilnson grew up. The band released their first Carbon neutral album in 2008, Jump the Fence.

In January 2012, the band created a Kickstarter campaign to help fund the recording of their newest album, Everybody Wins, which raised $8,000. Fans that donated money to the campaign chose from prize options such as receiving mix CDs, having the band play a show in the fan's hometown, and becoming an 'Honorary Hired Gun' and being named on the album. "Everybody Wins!" was released June 12, 2012.

Discography
 Jump the Fence, 2008
 The Double Single, 2009
 Everybody Wins!, June 2012

Chicago Roots Collective
CATHG is a founding member of the Chicago Roots Collective, a consortium of 10 local Chicago bands working together to promote each other's music. The idea to form the collective came about in the fall of 2008 at the Chicago Bluegrass and Blues Festival.

References

External links
 Official Website of Cobalt & the Hired Guns
 Cobalt & the Hired Guns on MySpace
 Cobalt & the Hired Guns on Facebook

Musical groups from Chicago
Pop punk groups from Illinois